TRL's Number Ones is the collection of music videos that had reached the number-one spot on the daily music video countdown show Total Request Live which aired on MTV from 1998 to 2008. Usually the same video will stay on the number-one spot for a series of weeks but after a certain period it will be retired or honorably discharged from the countdown and be put into the hall of fame. The music video is usually determined various ways such as voting online on MTV.com, the Billboard charts, ratings on the radio and downloads over the internet.

1998

1999

2000

2001

2002

2003

2004

2005

2006

January 3: "Because Of You" - Kelly Clarkson

January 4: "Because Of You" - Kelly Clarkson

January 5: "Because Of You" - Kelly Clarkson

January 6: "Because Of You" - Kelly Clarkson

January 9: "L. O. V. E." - Ashlee Simpson

January 10: "L. O. V. E." - Ashlee Simpson

January 11: "Bat Country" - Avenged Sevenfold

January 12: "L. O. V. E." - Ashlee Simpson

January 17: "L. O. V. E." - Ashlee Simpson

January 18: "Bat Country" - Avenged Sevenfold

January 19: "Bat Country" - Avenged Sevenfold

January 20: "L. O. V. E." - Ashlee Simpson

January 23: "Don't Forget About Us" - Mariah Carey

January 24: "Hung Up" - Madonna

January 25: "L. O. V. E." - Ashlee Simpson

January 26: "L. O. V. E." - Ashlee Simpson

January 30: "Don't Forget About Us" - Mariah Carey

January 31: "Don't Forget About Us" - Mariah Carey

February 1: "Don't Forget About Us" - Mariah Carey

February 2: "Don't Forget About Us" - Mariah Carey

February 6: "Hung Up" - Madonna

February 7: "Move Along" - The All-American Rejects

February 8: "Move Along" - The All-American Rejects

February 9: "Move Along" - The All-American Rejects

February 13: "Move Along" - The All-American Rejects

February 14: "Move Along" - The All-American Rejects

February 15: "L. O. V. E." - Ashlee Simpson

February 16: "Goodbye For Now" - P. O. D.

February 21: "L. O. V. E." - Ashlee Simpson

February 22: "L. O. V. E." - Ashlee Simpson

February 23: "Sorry" - Madonna

February 24: "Sorry" - Madonna

February 27: "Sorry" - Madonna

February 28: "Sorry" - Madonna

March 1: "Sorry" - Madonna

March 2: "Sorry" - Madonna

March 6: "Sorry" - Madonna

March 7: "The Real Thing" - Bo Bice

March 8: "Sorry" - Madonna

March 9: "Walk Away" - Kelly Clarkson

March 13: "Walk Away" - Kelly Clarkson

March 14: "Walk Away" - Kelly Clarkson

March 15: "So Sick" - Ne-Yo

March 16: "Walk Away" - Kelly Clarkson

March 20: "Walk Away" - Kelly Clarkson

March 21: "Hips Don't Lie" - Shakira featuring Wyclef Jean

March 22: "Walk Away" - Kelly Clarkson

March 23: "Walk Away" - Kelly Clarkson

March 24: "Let U Go" - Ashley Parker Angel

March 27: "Let U Go" - Ashley Parker Angel

March 28: "Let U Go" - Ashley Parker Angel

April 3: "Walk Away" - Kelly Clarkson

April 4: "Let U Go" - Ashley Parker Angel

April 5: "Let U Go" - Ashley Parker Angel

April 6: "Let U Go" - Ashley Parker Angel

April 10: "Walk Away" - Kelly Clarkson

April 11: "Temperature" - Sean Paul

April 12: "Walk Away" - Kelly Clarkson

April 13: "S. O. S. ( Rescue Me )" - Rihanna

April 17: "Walk Away" - Kelly Clarkson

April 18: "Walk Away" - Kelly Clarkson

April 19: "Say Somethin'" - Mariah Carey featuring Snoop Dogg

April 20: "Say Somethin'" - Mariah Carey featuring Snoop Dogg

April 24: "Say Somethin'" - Mariah Carey featuring Snoop Dogg

April 25: "Where'd You Go" - Fort Minor featuring Holly Brook

April 26: "Say Somethin'" - Mariah Carey featuring Snoop Dogg

April 27: "Say Somethin'" - Mariah Carey featuring Snoop Dogg

May 1: "Where'd You Go" - Fort Minor featuring Holly Brook

May 2: "Where'd You Go" - Fort Minor featuring Holly Brook

May 3: "Walk Away" - Kelly Clarkson

May 4: "Walk Away" - Kelly Clarkson

May 5: "A Little Less Sixteen Candles, A Little More ( Touch Me )" - Fall Out Boy

May 8: "A Little Less Sixteen Candles, A Little More ( Touch Me )" - Fall Out Boy

May 9: "Dani California" - Red Hot Chili Peppers

May 10: "Dani California" - Red Hot Chili Peppers

May 11: "Dani California" - Red Hot Chili Peppers

May 15: "Walk Away" - Kelly Clarkson

May 16: "Walk Away" - Kelly Clarkson

May 17: "Where'd You Go" - Fort Minor featuring Holly Brook

May 18: "Unfaithful" - Rihanna

May 22: "Walk Away" - Kelly Clarkson

May 23: "Unfaithful" - Rihanna

May 24: "Unfaithful" - Rihanna

May 25: "Unfaithful" - Rihanna

May 29: "Walk Away" - Kelly Clarkson

May 30: "Unfaithful" - Rihanna

May 31: "Why You Wanna" - T. I.

June 1: "Walk Away" - Kelly Clarkson

June 2: "Why You Wanna" - T. I.

June 5: "Unfaithful" - Rihanna

June 6: "Unfaithful" - Rihanna

June 7: "Why You Wanna" - T. I.

June 8: "Unfaithful" - Rihanna

June 9: "Why You Wanna" - T. I.

June 12: "Unfaithful" - Rihanna

June 13: "Unfaithful" - Rihanna

June 14: "Unfaithful" - Rihanna

June 15: "Promiscuous" - Nelly Furtado featuring Timbaland

June 19: "Unfaithful" - Rihanna

June 20: "Unfaithful" - Rihanna

June 21: "Unfaithful" - Rihanna, and Top 10 Christina Aguilera Videos #1 Video ( Chronological Order ): "Ain't No Other Man" - Christina Aguilera ( 2006 & World Premiere )

June 22: "Me & U" - Cassie

June 26: "Ain't No Other Man" - Christina Aguilera

June 27: "Me & U" - Cassie

June 28: "Me & U" - Cassie

June 29: "Ain't No Other Man" - Christina Aguilera

July 10: "Ain't No Other Man" - Christina Aguilera

July 11: "Ain't No Other Man" - Christina Aguilera

July 12: "Ain't No Other Man" - Christina Aguilera

July 13: "Ain't No Other Man" - Christina Aguilera

July 17: "Where'd You Go" - Fort Minor featuring Holly Brook

July 18: "Ain't No Other Man" - Christina Aguilera

July 19: "Deja Vu" - Beyoncé featuring Jay-Z

July 20: "Invisible" - Ashlee Simpson

July 24: "Ain't No Other Man" - Christina Aguilera

July 25: "Ain't No Other Man" - Christina Aguilera

July 26: "Deja Vu" - Beyoncé featuring Jay-Z

July 27: "Deja Vu" - Beyoncé featuring Jay-Z

July 31: "SexyBack" - Justin Timberlake featuring Timbaland

August 1: "SexyBack" - Justin Timberlake featuring Timbaland

August 2: "SexyBack" - Justin Timberlake featuring Timbaland

August 3: "Ain't No Other Man" - Christina Aguilera

August 7: "Ain't No Other Man" - Christina Aguilera

August 8: "SexyBack" - Justin Timberlake featuring Timbaland

August 9: "SexyBack" - Justin Timberlake featuring Timbaland

August 10: "Ain't No Other Man" - Christina Aguilera

August 14: "Ain't No Other Man" - Christina Aguilera

August 15: "Ain't No Other Man" - Christina Aguilera

August 16: "Ain't No Other Man" - Christina Aguilera

August 17: "Ain't No Other Man" - Christina Aguilera

August 21: "SexyBack" - Justin Timberlake featuring Timbaland

August 22: "Ain't No Other Man" - Christina Aguilera

August 23: "SexyBack" - Justin Timberlake featuring Timbaland

August 24: "Ain't No Other Man" - Christina Aguilera

August 28: "Call Me When You're Sober" - Evanescence

August 29: "Ain't No Other Man" - Christina Aguilera

August 30: "Call Me When You're Sober" - Evanescence

August 31: "Call Me When You're Sober" - Evanescence

September 1: "Call Me When You're Sober" - Evanescence

September 5: "Call Me When You're Sober" - Evanescence, and Top Ten Beyoncé Videos #1 Video: "Ring The Alarm" - Beyoncé

September 6: "Call Me When You're Sober" - Evanescence

September 7: "Call Me When You're Sober" - Evanescence

September 8: "Call Me When You're Sober" - Evanescence

September 11: "Call Me When You're Sober" - Evanescence

September 12: "SexyBack" - Justin Timberlake featuring Timbaland

September 13: "SexyBack" - Justin Timberlake featuring Timbaland

September 20: "SexyBack" - Justin Timberlake featuring Timbaland

September 21: "SexyBack" - Justin Timberlake featuring Timbaland

September 25: "Ain't No Other Man" - Christina Aguilera

September 26: "Ain't No Other Man" - Christina Aguilera

September 27: "SexyBack" - Justin Timberlake featuring Timbaland

September 28: "Ring The Alarm" - Beyoncé

September 29: "Love Like Winter" - AFI

October 2: "SexyBack" - Justin Timberlake featuring Timbaland

October 3: "Love Like Winter" - AFI

October 4: "Love Like Winter" - AFI

October 5: "SexyBack" - Justin Timberlake featuring Timbaland

October 10: "SexyBack" - Justin Timberlake featuring Timbaland

October 11: "Love Like Winter" - AFI

October 12: "U + Ur Hand" - P!nk

October 16: "U + Ur Hand" - Pink

October 17: "Love Me Or Hate Me" - Lady Sovereign

October 18: "My Love" - Justin Timberlake featuring T. I.

October 19: "Love Like Winter" - AFI

October 23: "Love Like Winter" - AFI

October 24: "Hurt" - Christina Aguilera

October 25: "Hurt" - Christina Aguilera

October 26: "My Love" - Justin Timberlake featuring T. I.

October 30: "Hurt" - Christina Aguilera

October 31: "My Love" - Justin Timberlake featuring T. I.

November 1: "Hurt" - Christina Aguilera

November 2: "Irreplaceable" - Beyoncé

November 6: "Hurt" - Christina Aguilera

November 7: "Irreplaceable" - Beyoncé

November 8: "Hurt" - Christina Aguilera

November 9: "Hurt" - Christina Aguilera

November 13: "My Love" - Justin Timberlake featuring T. I.

November 14: "My Love" - Justin Timberlake featuring T. I.

November 15: "Hurt" - Christina Aguilera

November 16: "You Don't Know" - Eminem featuring 50 Cent, Lloyd Banks, & Ca$his

November 17: "Hurt" - Christina Aguilera

November 20: "You Don't Know" - Eminem featuring 50 Cent, Lloyd Banks, & Ca$his

November 27: "Irreplaceable" - Beyoncé

November 28: "You Don't Know" - Eminem featuring 50 Cent, Lloyd Banks, & Ca$his

November 29: "Irreplaceable" - Beyoncé

November 30: "Hurt" - Christina Aguilera

December 4: "Hurt" - Christina Aguilera

December 5: "You Don't Know" - Eminem featuring 50 Cent, Lloyd Banks,& Ca$his

December 6: "You Don't Know" - Eminem featuring 50 Cent, Lloyd Banks, & Ca$his

December 7: "You Don't Know" - Eminem featuring 50 Cent, Lloyd Banks, & Ca$his

December 11: "Irreplaceable" - Beyoncé

December 12: "Irreplaceable" - Beyoncé

December 13: "Irreplaceable" - Beyoncé

December 14: "Irreplaceable" - Beyoncé

December 18: "Irreplaceable" - Beyoncé

December 19: "Hurt" - Christina Aguilera

December 20: "Irreplaceable" - Beyoncé

December 21: "How To Save A Life" - The Fray

2007

January 8: "This Ain't A Scene, It's An Arms Race" - Fall Out Boy

January 9: "This Ain't A Scene, It's An Arms Race" - Fall Out Boy

January 10: "This Ain't A Scene, It's An Arms Race" - Fall Out Boy

January 11: "Hurt" - Christina Aguilera

January 16: "This Ain't A Scene, It's An Arms Race" - Fall Out Boy

January 17: "This Ain't A Scene, It's An Arms Race" - Fall Out Boy

January 18: "Irreplaceable" - Beyoncé

January 19: "This Ain't A Scene, It's An Arms Race" - Fall Out Boy

January 22: "Say It Right" - Nelly Furtado

January 23: "Say It Right" - Nelly Furtado

January 24: "Famous Last Words" - My Chemical Romance

January 25: "This Ain't A Scene, It's An Arms Race" - Fall Out Boy

January 29: "Famous Last Words" - My Chemical Romance

January 30: "Famous Last Words" - My Chemical Romance

January 31: "This Ain't A Scene, It's An Arms Race" - Fall Out Boy

February 1: "Famous Last Words" - My Chemical Romance

February 5: 1. "This Ain't A Scene, It's An Arms Race" - Fall Out Boy. 2. Katharine McPhee's Playlist #1 Video: "Don't Stop Belevin'" - Journey.

February 6: 1. "This Ain't A Scene, It's An Arms Race" - Fall Out Boy.

2. Fall Out Boy's Playlist #1 Video: "Mo Money, Mo Problems" - The Notorious B. I. G. feat Mase & P. Diddy.

February 7: 1. "This Ain't A Scene, It's An Arms Race" - Fall Out Boy.

2. Fergie's Playlist #1 Video: "I Love Rock N' Roll" - Joan Jett & The Blackhearts.

February 8: 1. "This Ain't A Scene, It's An Arms Race" - Fall Out Boy.

2. Hilary Duff's Playlist #1 Video: "Beautiful Day" - U2

February 9: 1. "This Ain't A Scene, It's An Arms Race" - Fall Out Boy.

2. Good Charlotte's Playlist #1 Video: "Rock The Casbah" - The Clash

February 12: "Famous Last Words" - My Chemical Romance

February 13: "Famous Last Words" - My Chemical Romance

February 14: "Que Hiciste" - Jennifer Lopez

February 15: "Famous Last Words" - My Chemical Romance

February 20: "Famous Last Words" - My Chemical Romance

February 21: "With Love" - Hilary Duff

February 22: "With Love" - Hilary Duff

February 23: "Famous Last Words" - My Chemical Romance

February 26: "With Love" - Hilary Duff

February 27: "Candyman" - Christina Aguilera

February 28: "With Love" - Hilary Duff

March 1: "Over It" - Katharine McPhee

March 5: "Over It" - Katharine McPhee

March 6: "Candyman" - Christina Aguilera

March 7: "Candyman" - Christina Aguilera

March 8: "Beautiful Liar" - Beyoncé featuring Shakira

March 12: "Candyman" - Christina Aguilera

March 13: "Beautiful Liar" - Beyoncé featuring Shakira

March 14: "Beautiful Liar" - Beyoncé featuring Shakira

March 15: "Beautiful Liar" - Beyoncé featuring Shakira

March 19: "Beautiful Liar" - Beyoncé featuring Shakira

March 20: "Girlfriend" - Avril Lavigne

March 21: "Girlfriend" - Avril Lavigne

March 22: "Beautiful Liar" - Beyoncé featuring Shakira

March 26: "Girlfriend" - Avril Lavigne

March 27: "With Love" - Hilary Duff

March 28: "Girlfriend" - Avril Lavigne

March 29: "With Love" - Hilary Duff

April 16: "With Love" - Hilary Duff

April 17: "Thnks Fr Th Mmrs" - Fall Out Boy

April 18: "Beautiful Liar" - Beyoncé featuring Shakira

April 19: "Thnks Fr Th Mmrs" - Fall Out Boy

April 23: "Thnks Fr Th Mmrs" - Fall Out Boy

April 24: "Thnks Fr Th Mmrs" - Fall Out Boy

April 25: "With Love" - Hilary Duff

April 26: "What I've Done" - Linkin Park

April 30: "What I've Done" - Linkin Park

May 1: "What I've Done" - Linkin Park

May 2: "Thnks Fr Th Mmrs" - Fall Out Boy

May 3: "What I've Done" - Linkin Park

May 7: "What I've Done" - Linkin Park

May 8: "What I've Done" - Linkin Park

May 9: "Umbrella" - Rihanna featuring Jay-Z

May 10: "Never Again" - Kelly Clarkson

May 14: "Umbrella" - Rihanna featuring Jay-Z

May 15: "Never Again" - Kelly Clarkson

May 16: "Never Again" - Kelly Clarkson

May 17: "Umbrella" - Rihanna featuring Jay-Z

May 21: "Never Again" - Kelly Clarkson

May 22: 1. "Umbrella" - Rihanna featuring Jay-Z

2. TRL 2000th Episode Countdown #1 Video: "Cry Me A River" - Justin Timberlake

May 23: "Home" - Daughtry

May 24: "Umbrella" - Rihanna featuring Jay-Z

May 29: "Umbrella" - Rihanna featuring Jay-Z

May 30: "Umbrella" - Rihanna featuring Jay-Z

May 31: "Umbrella" - Rihanna featuring Jay-Z

June 1: "Umbrella" - Rihanna featuring Jay-Z

June 4: "Umbrella" - Rihanna featuring Jay-Z

June 5: "Umbrella" - Rihanna featuring Jay-Z

June 6: "Umbrella" - Rihanna featuring Jay-Z

June 7: "Rehab" - Amy Winehouse

June 11: "Rehab" - Amy Winehouse

June 12: "Umbrella" - Rihanna featuring Jay-Z

June 13: "Umbrella" - Rihanna featuring Jay-Z

June 14: "Lip Gloss" - Lil' Mama

June 18: "Lip Gloss" - Lil' Mama

June 19: "Lip Gloss" - Lil' Mama

June 20: "Umbrella" - Rihanna featuring Jay-Z

June 21: "Lip Gloss" - Lil' Mama

June 26: "Lip Gloss" - Lil' Mama

June 27: "Lip Gloss" - Lil' Mama

June 28: "Party Like A Rockstar" - Shop Boyz

July 2: "Party Like A Rockstar" - Shop Boyz

July 3: "Party Like A Rockstar" - Shop Boyz

July 4: "Party Like A Rockstar" - Shop Boyz

July 5: "Lip Gloss" - Lil' Mama

July 9: "Teenagers" - My Chemical Romance

July 10: "Teenagers" - My Chemical Romance

July 11: "The Take Over, The Break's Over" - Fall Out Boy

July 12: "The Take Over, The Break's Over" - Fall Out Boy

July 16: "The Take Over, The Break's Over" - Fall Out Boy

July 17: "Wall To Wall" - Chris Brown

July 18: "The Take Over, The Break's Over" - Fall Out Boy

July 19: "The Take Over, The Break's Over" - Fall Out Boy

July 23: "Lip Gloss" - Lil' Mama

July 24: "The Take Over, The Break's Over" - Fall Out Boy

July 25: "The Take Over, The Break's Over" - Fall Out Boy

July 26: "Wall To Wall" - Chris Brown

July 30: "Wall To Wall" - Chris Brown

July 31: "The Great Escape" - Boys Like Girls

August 1: "The Great Escape" - Boys Like Girls

August 2: "Clothes Off" - Gym Class Heroes

August 6: "Clothes Off" - Gym Class Heroes

August 7: "The Great Escape" - Boys Like Girls

August 8: "The Great Escape" - Boys Like Girls

August 9: "The Great Escape" - Boys Like Girls

August 13: "Easy" - Paula DeAnda featuring Bow Wow

August 14: "Easy" - Paula DeAnda featuring Bow Wow

August 15: "The Great Escape" - Boys Like Girls

August 16: "Clothes Off" - Gym Class Heroes

August 20: "Clothes Off" - Gym Class Heroes

August 21: "Clothes Off" - Gym Class Heroes

August 22: "When You're Gone" - Avril Lavigne

August 23: "Easy" - Paula DeAnda featuring Bow Wow

August 27: "Easy" - Paula DeAnda featuring Bow Wow

August 28: "When You're Gone" - Avril Lavigne

August 29: "When You're Gone" - Avril Lavigne

August 30: "The Great Escape" - Boys Like Girls

September 4: "The Great Escape" - Boys Like Girls

September 5: "The Great Escape" - Boys Like Girls

September 6: "When You're Gone" - Avril Lavigne

September 7: "Do It" - Nelly Furtado

September 10: "Do It" - Nelly Furtado

September 11: "Do It" - Nelly Furtado

September 12: "Hip Hop Police" - Chamillionaire featuring Slick Rick

September 13: "Do It" - Nelly Furtado

September 17: "Do It" - Nelly Furtado

September 18: "Do It" - Nelly Furtado

September 19: "Hip Hop Police" - Chemillionaire featuring Slick Rick

September 20: "Hip Hop Police" - Chamillionaire featuring Slick Rick

October 1: "Misery Business" - Paramore

October 2: "Money In The Bank" - Swiss Beatz

October 3: "Hip Hop Police" - Chamillionaire featuring Slick Rick

October 4: "Misery Business" - Paramore

October 8: "Misery Business" - Paramore

October 9: "Hate That I Love You" - Rihanna featuring Ne-Yo

October 10: "Hate That I Love You" - Rihanna featuring Ne-Yo

October 11: "He Said She Said" - Ashley Tisdale

October 15: "He Said She Said" - Ashley Tisdale

October 16: "He Said She Said" - Ashley Tisdale

October 17: "Kiss Kiss" - Chris Brown featuring T-Pain

October 18: "He Said She Said" - Ashley Tisdale

October 22: "Crank That ( Soulja Boy )" - Soulja Boy Tell'em

October 23: "Crank That ( Soulja Boy )" - Soulja Boy Tell'em

October 24: "Crank That ( Soulja Boy )" - Soulja Boy Tell'em

October 25: "Kiss Kiss" - Chris Brown featuring T-Pain

October 29: "Crank That ( Soulja Boy )" - Soulja Boy Tell'em

October 30: "Apologize" - Timbaland featuring OneRepublic

October 31: "Apologize" - Timbaland featuring OneRepublic

November 1: "Apologize" - Timbaland featuring OneRepublic

November 5: "Apologize" - Timbaland featuring OneRepublic

November 6: "Apologize" - Timbaland featuring OneRepublic

November 7: "Apologize" - Timbaland featuring OneRepublic

November 8: "No One" - Alicia Keys

November 12: "No One" - Alicia Keys

November 13: "No One" - Alicia Keys

November 14: "No One" - Alicia Keys

November 15: "No One" - Alicia Keys

November 19: "No One" - Alicia Keys

November 20: "No One" - Alicia Keys

November 26: "No One" - Alicia Keys

November 27: "No One" - Alicia Keys

November 28: "Apologize" - Timbaland featuring OneRepublic

December 10: "No One" - Alicia Keys

December 11: "No One" - Alicia Keys

December 12: "No One" - Alicia Keys

December 13: "No One" - Alicia Keys

December 17: "No One" - Alicia Keys

December 19: "No One" - Alicia Keys

December 20: "Low" - Flo Rida featuring T-Pain

2008

January 7: "Low" - Flo Rida featuring T-Pain

January 8: "Low" - Flo Rida featuring T-Pain

January 9: "Low" - Flo Rida featuring T-Pain

January 10: "Low" - Flo Rida featuring T-Pain

January 14: "Low" - Flo Rida featuring T-Pain

January 15: "Low" - Flo Rida featuring T-Pain

January 16: "Low" - Flo Rida featuring T-Pain

January 17: "Low" - Flo Rida featuring T-Pain

January 22: "Low" - Flo Rida featuring T-Pain

January 23: "Low" - Flo Rida featuring T-Pain

January 24: "Low" - Flo Rida featuring T-Pain

January 28: "Low" - Flo Rida featuring T-Pain

January 29: "Low" - Flo Rida featuring T-Pain

January 30: "Low" - Flo Rida featuring T-Pain

January 31: "Low" - Flo Rida featuring T-Pain

February 4: "Low" - Flo Rida featuring T-Pain

February 5: "Low" - Flo Rida featuring T-Pain

February 6: Special TRL - MTV. com videos ( #1 Video ): "Low" - Flo Rida featuring T-Pain

February 11: "Low" - Flo Rida featuring T-Pain

February 12: "Low" - Flo Rida featuring T-Pain

February 13: "Low" - Flo Rida featuring T-Pain

February 14: "Low" - Flo Rida featuring T-Pain

February 25: "Low" - Flo Rida featuring T-Pain

February 26: "With You" - Chris Brown

February 27: "With You" - Chris Brown

February 28: "With You" - Chris Brown

March 3: "With You" - Chris Brown

March 4: Top 15 Online Views #1 Video: "Touch My Body" - Mariah Carey

March 5: "With You" - Chris Brown

March 6: Top 10 Online Views #1 Video: "Yahhh" - Soulja Boy Tell'em featuring Arab

March 10: "With You" - Chris Brown

March 11: "With You" - Chris Brown

March 12: Top 10 Online Views #1 Video: "Shawty Get Loose" - Lil' Mama featuring Chris Brown & T-Pain

March 13: Snoop Dogg Takes Over

March 17: "With You" - Chris Brown

March 18: "With You" - Chris Brown

March 19: "With You" - Chris Brown

March 20: "Elevator" - Flo Rida featuring Timbaland

April 7: "Bleeding Love" - Leona Lewis

April 8: "Touch My Body" - Mariah Carey

April 9: "Bleeding Love" - Leona Lewis

April 10: No TRL

April 14: "Touch My Body" - Mariah Carey

April 15: "Touch My Body" - Mariah Carey

April 16: ( Votes only ) "4 Minutes" - Madonna featuring Justin Timberlake & Timbaland

April 17: ( Online views ) "Love In This Club" - Usher featuring Young Jeezy

April 21: "Bleeding Love" - Leona Lewis

April 23: "Bleeding Love" - Leona Lewis

April 24: "Bleeding Love" - Leona Lewis

April 28: "Lollipop" - Lil' Wayne featuring Static Major

April 29: "Lollipop" - Lil' Wayne featuring Static

April 30: "Lollipop" - Lil' Wayne featuring Static

May 1: "Lollipop" - Lil' Wayne featuring Static

May 5:
May 6: ( Votes Only ) "Ready Set Go"- Tokio Hotel

May 7: "Lollipop" - Lil' Wayne featuring Static

May 8: "Lollipop" - Lil' Wayne featuring Static

May 13: "Lollipop" - Lil' Wayne featuring Static

May 14: "Lollipop" - Lil' Wayne featuring Static

May 15: "Lollipop" - Lil' Wayne featuring Static

May 20: "Lollipop" - Lil' Wayne featuring Static

May 21: "Lollipop" - Lil' Wayne featuring Static

May 22: "Lollipop" - Lil' Wayne featuring Static

May 27: Usher Videos, First Looks, Best Kiss Nominees ( MTV Movie Awards )

May 28: Sizzlin' Summer Videos

May 29: "Lollipop" - Lil' Wayne featuring Static

June 2: Ultimate Blonde Videos

June 3: "Lollipop" - Lil' Wayne featuring Static

June 4: "Lollipop" - Lil' Wayne featuring Static

June 5: "Take A Bow" - Rihanna

June 10: "Lollipop" - Lil' Wayne featuring Static

June 11: "Lollipop" - Lil' Wayne featuring Static

June 12: "Lollipop" - Lil' Wayne featuring Static

June 13: Video DJ

June 16: "Take A Bow" - Rihanna

June 17: "Take A Bow" - Rihanna

June 18: "Take A Bow" - Rihanna

June 19: "Take A Bow" - Rihanna

June 23: "Take A Bow" - Rihanna

June 24: "I Kissed A Girl" - Katy Perry

June 25: Video DJ w/ DJ Randy

June 26: Video DJ w/ DJ Randy

June 30: "I Kissed A Girl" - Katy Perry

July 1: "I Kissed A Girl" - Katy Perry

July 2: "I Kissed A Girl" - Katy Perry

July 3: "I Kissed A Girl" - Katy Perry

July 7: "I Kissed A Girl" - Katy Perry

July 8: "I Kissed A Girl" - Katy Perry

July 9: TRL Second Chance

July 10: "I Kissed a Girl" - Katy Perry

July 15: "I Kissed A Girl" - Katy Perry

July 16: "I Kissed A Girl" - Katy Perry

July 17: "I Kissed A Girl" - Katy Perry

July 21: "I Kissed A Girl" - Katy Perry

July 22: "I Kissed A Girl" - Katy Perry

July 23: "I Kissed A Girl" - Katy Perry

July 24: "I Kissed A Girl" - Katy Perry

July 28: "I Kissed A Girl" - Katy Perry

July 29: "I Kissed A Girl" - Katy Perry

July 30: "I Kissed A Girl" - Katy Perry

July 31: "I Kissed A Girl" - Katy Perry

August 5: "Closer" - Ne-Yo

August 6: "Disturbia" - Rihanna

August 7: "Disturbia" - Rihanna

August 11: "Disturbia" - Rihanna

August 12: "Disturbia" - Rihanna

August 13: "Disturbia" - Rihanna

August 14: "Disturbia" - Rihanna

August 19: "Paper Planes" - M.I.A

August 20: "Disturbia" - Rihanna

August 21: "Disturbia" - Rihanna

August 26: "Disturbia" - Rihanna

August 27: "Disturbia" - Rihanna

August 28: High School Videos

September 2: "Disturbia" - Rihanna

September 3: "Whatever You Like" - T. I.

September 4: VMA Videos

September 8: "Whatever You Like" - T. I.

September 9: ( MTV. com Streams ) "Official Girl" - Cassie featuring Lil' Wayne

September 10: "Whatever You Like" - T. I.

September 11: "Whatever You Like" - T. I.

October 14: Beyoncé #1 Video - "Irreplaceable"

October 15: ( MTV. com Top 10 ) "She Got Her Own" - Ne-Yo featuring Jamie Foxx & Fabolous

October 16: ( MTV. com Top 10 ) "She Got Her Own" - Ne-Yo featuring Jamie Foxx & Fabolous

October 21:
 ( Girl Power Top 10 ) "Survivor" - Destiny's Child
 ( #1 TRL Time Squares Moment ) Eminem shuts down Times Square ( November 8, 2002 )

October 22:
( Hip Hop Top 10 ) "Lose Yourself" - Eminem
 ( #1 Athlete Moment ) LeBron vs. Magic ( June 16, 2003 )

October 23:
 ( Favorite 1sts Top 10 ) "Baby One More Time" - Britney Spears
 ( #1 Field Trip Moment ) Damien interviews Stewie

October 28:
 ( Boy Band Top 10 ) "Bye, Bye, Bye" - 'N Sync
 ( #1 Only On TRL Moment ) Black Attack ( October 16, 2003 ), ( May 29, 2006 ), ( December 5, 2005 ), ( November 11, 2003 ), ( September 29, 2003 ), ( May 5, 2008 )

October 29:
 ( One-Hit Wonder Top 10 ) "Thong Song" - Sisqo
 ( #1 TRL On Location Moments ) TRL @ Your House ( April 14, 2001 )

October 30:
 ( Collaboration Top 10 ) "Lady Marmalade" - Christina Aguilera featuring Lil' Kim, Pink, & Mýa
 ( #1 TRL Show Opener ) TRL Hogan Style ( March 15, 2006 )

November 4:
 ( Funniest Video Top 10 ) "The Bad Touch" - Bloodhound Gang
 ( #1 Celebrity Odd Couple ) Elton John and Justin Timberlake Dream Therapy ( January 11, 2002 )

November 5: ( #1 MTV News Moment ) TBA

November 6:
 ( Rock Videos Countdown ) "What's My Age Again" - Blink-182
 ( #1 Top 10 Unscripted Moments ) Ron Burgundy on TRL ( June 30, 2004 )

November 11:
 ( #1 TRL Videos Countdown ) "( God Must Have Spent ) A Little Time On You" - N' Sync
 ( #1 Top 10 Awkward Moments ) Liam Gallagher being Liam Gallagher ( March 30, 2000 )

November 12:
 ( Celebrity Cameo Countdown ) "Bad Boy For Life" - P. Diddy
 ( #1 Top 10 Fan Moments ) Hilarie Burton: A Star Is Born ( September 8, 2000 )

November 13: ( TRL Top 10 Performance Countdown ) "Like I Love You" - Justin Timberlake

November 16:
 Finale
 (Top Ten Iconic Videos) "... Baby One More Time" - Britney Spears
 Performances by Beyoncé, Fall Out Boy, Ludacris, Nelly, Snoop Dogg, Backstreet Boys, 50 Cent.
 Many guests stop by for a visit.
 Memories

Final top 10
TRL chose the top ten most iconic videos and aired them as their final countdown.

See also
 106 & Park
 MuchOnDemand

References

1990s American music television series
2000s American music television series
1998 American television series debuts
2008 American television series endings
Lists of music videos
MTV original programming